Iridomyrmex mayri is a species of ant in the genus Iridomyrmex. Described by Forel in 1915, the species is endemic to Australia, these ants commonly nests under stones and rotting logs, and forage on tree trunks. The species also tends to larvae of Jalmenus evagoras butterflies.

References

Iridomyrmex
Hymenoptera of Australia
Insects described in 1915